Plodopitomnik is a rural locality (a settlement) in Blagoveshchensk Urban Okrug, Amur Oblast, Russia. The population was 1,081 as of 2018. There are 19 streets.

Geography 
The settlement is satellite town of Blagoveshchensk.

References 

Rural localities in Blagoveshchensk urban okrug
Blagoveshchensk